Yang Hao may refer to:

Yang Hao (Sui dynasty) (586–618), prince and claimant to the throne of Sui dynasty
Yang Hao (Ming dynasty) (fl. 1596–1629), official and military leader

Sportspeople
Yang Hao (volleyball) (born 1980), Chinese volleyball player
Yang Hao (footballer, born 1983), Chinese football player for Jiangsu Sainty
Yang Hao (footballer, born 1990), Chinese football player for Chengdu Tiancheng
Yang Hao (diver) (born 1998), Chinese diver